Sora tob sakana was a Japanese alternative idol girl group formed in 2014. They released their debut single, "Yozora o Zenbu", on October 27, 2015.

History
Sora tob sakana formed in July 2014 as the second act in the Frappe Idol Project after Siam & Poptune. They debuted in October 2015 with the single, "Yozora o Zenbu". Their second single, "Mahō no Kotoba", was released in February 2016. The group released their eponymous first studio album in July 2016. In April 2017, they released their first EP, Cocoon, followed by the group's first major label release: their second EP, Alight, in May 2018. Their third single, "New Stranger" was released in July 2018 and was featured in Hi Score Girl as the opening theme. They released their second studio album, World Fragment Tour, in March 2019.  Their fourth single, "Sasayakana Shukusai", which was released in July 2019, was featured in Is It Wrong to Try to Pick Up Girls in a Dungeon? II as the ending theme. Their fifth single, "Flash", which was released in November 2019 was featured in Hi Score Girl II as the opening theme. On May 22, 2020, the group announced that they would disband on September 6. They released their third and final studio album, Deep blue, on August 5, 2020.

Members

Final
Natsuka Teraguchi (寺口夏花, Teraguchi Natsuka)
Fuka Kanzaki (神﨑風花, Kanzaki Fuuka)
Mana Yamazaki (山崎愛, Yamazaki Mana)

Former
Yuiko Konishi (小西結子, Konishi Yuiko)
Mio Satō (佐藤美緒, Satō Mio)
Ray Malaika Kazama (風間玲マライカ, Kazama Rei Maraika)

Discography

Studio albums

Extended plays

Singles

References

External links
Official website

Japanese girl groups
Japanese idol groups
Japanese pop music groups
Musical groups from Tokyo
Musical groups established in 2014
Musical groups disestablished in 2020
2014 establishments in Japan
2020 disestablishments in Japan